Cyperus erythrorhizos is a species of sedge known by the common names red-rooted flatsedge or redroot flatsedge. It is found across much of North America from Maine, Ontario and British Columbia south to Tabasco in southern Mexico.

Cyperus erythrorhizos is a plant of wet areas such as rivers and ditches, generally at low elevations. It gets its common and scientific names from the red color of its roots. This sedge grows to a maximum of a meter in height, but is usually quite a bit shorter. It may have a number of long, wispy leaves around the base of the plant. The inflorescence may contain one to several spikes, each spike containing 20 to over 100 spikelets. Each spikelet is light greenish brown to reddish brown and is made up of up to 30 bracted flowers. The fruit is a glossy achene about a millimetre long.

See also
 List of Cyperus species

References

External links
Jepson Manual Treatment
Photo gallery

erythrorhizos
Flora of North America
Plants described in 1817
Taxa named by Gotthilf Heinrich Ernst Muhlenberg